Hofstetten-Grünau is a town in the district of Sankt Pölten-Land in the Austrian state of Lower Austria.

Population

Personalities
It is alleged that the Christian mystic Agnes Blannbekin was born in the village of Plambach, which is now part of Hofstetten-Grünau.

References

Cities and towns in St. Pölten-Land District